Afua Cooper (born 8 November 1957) is a Jamaican-born Canadian historian. In 2018 she is an associate professor of sociology at Dalhousie University. She is an author and dub poet. As of 2018 she has published five volumes of poetry.

Early life and education

Born in Westmoreland, Jamaica, Afua Cooper grew up in Kingston, Jamaica, and migrated to Toronto in 1980. She studied history at the University of Toronto, where she earned a PhD in African-Canadian history with specialties in slavery and abolition. Her dissertation, "Doing Battle in Freedom's Cause", is a biographical study of Henry Bibb, a 19th-century African-American abolitionist who lived and worked in Ontario.

Career
Afua Cooper has published four books of poetry, including Memories Have Tongue (1994), one of the finalists in the 1992 Casa de las Americas literary award. She is the co-author of We're Rooted Here and They Can't Pull Us Up: Essays in African Canadian Women's History (1994). She has also released two albums of her poetry.

Her book The Hanging of Angelique (2006) tells the story of an enslaved African Marie-Joseph Angelique who was executed in Montreal at a time when Quebec was under French colonial rule. It was shortlisted for the 2006 Governor General's Literary Award for non-fiction.

In 2011 Afua Cooper was named to the James Robinson Johnston Chair in Black Canadian Studies at Dalhousie University. She also has expertise in women's history and New France studies.

In 2016 Afua Cooper led the creation of a minor program in black and African diaspora studies at Dalhousie. In 2018 she was named poet laureate for the city of Halifax, holding the role until 2020.

Afua Cooper has also written two historical novels for children, both based on real historical figures. My name is Henry Bibb: a story of slavery and freedom; and My name is Phillis Wheatley: a story of slavery and freedom, both published in 2009 by Kids Can Press.

Awards 
We're Rooted Here and They Can't Pull Us Up: Essays in African Canadian Women's History was awarded the Ontario Historical Society's Joseph Brant Award for History in 1994. She is a winner of the Harry Jerome Award for professional excellence In 2015, Cooper received the Novia Scotia Human Rights Commission’s Dr. Burnley Allan “Rocky” Jones Award. In 2020, Cooper was awarded the Portia White Prize at the Creative Nova Scotia Awards Gala.

Books
 Breaking Chains (Weelahs, 1983)
 Red Caterpillar On College Street (Sister Vision Press, 1989)
 Memories Have Tongue: Poetry (Sister Vision Press, 1992)
 We're Rooted Here and They Can't Pull Us Up: Essays in African Canadian Women's History, with Peggy Bristow, Dionne Brand, Linda Carty, Sylvia Hamilton and Adrienne Shadd (University of Toronto Press, 1994)
 Utterances and Incantations: Women, Poetry, and Dub (Sister Vision Press, 1999)
 The Underground Railroad: Next Stop, Toronto!, with Adrienne Shadd and Carolyn Smardz Frost (Natural Heritage Books, 2002)
 The Hanging of Angélique, The Untold Story of Canadian Slavery and the Burning of Old Montréal (HarperCollins, 2006)
 Copper Woman and Other Poems(Natural Heritage Books, 2006)
 My Name is Henry Bibb: A Story of Slavery and Freedom [historical fiction] (Kids Can Press, 2009)
 My Name is Phillis Wheatley: A Story of Slavery and Freedom [historical fiction] (Kids Can Press, 2009)
 "To Learn… Even a Little, The Letters of Solomon Washington," in Hoping for Home, The Stories of Arrival (Scholastic Canada, 2011), 171–91.

Discography
 WomanTalk: Women Dub Poets (Heartbeat Records, 1984)
 Poetry Is Not a Luxury (Maya Music Group, 1985)
 Your Silence Will Not Protect You (Maya Music, 1986)
 Sunshine (Maya Music Group, 1989)
 Worlds of Fire (Soundmind Productions, 2002)
 Love and Revolution (Soundmind Productions, 2014)

References

External links

Afua Cooper Papers at the Thomas Fisher Rare Book Library - various personal and professional material, including poem and academic manuscripts
Glossary of Canadian Poets
The Canadian Encyclopedia

1957 births
Living people
20th-century Canadian poets
Black Canadian women
People from Westmoreland Parish
Jamaican emigrants to Canada
Canadian women poets
Black Canadian musicians
Black Canadian writers
Canadian reggae musicians
Musicians from Toronto
Writers from Toronto
Jamaican dub poets
Academic staff of the University of Toronto
20th-century Canadian women writers
20th-century Canadian historians
Canadian women non-fiction writers
Canadian women historians
African-Canadian feminism
Poets Laureate of Halifax, Nova Scotia
21st-century Canadian poets
21st-century Canadian non-fiction writers
21st-century Canadian women writers